The Imam Sadiq University is an Islamic  private university in Tehran, Iran. Established in 1982, the goal of the university is to bridge the gap between Islamic researches and modern studies, especially humanities. Imam Sadiq was established on the premises that used to house the Harvard School of Management until the 1979 Iranian Revolution.

The university is regarded as one of the elite universities in Iran that has played a prime role in recruiting politicians and other prime figures in the Islamic Republic of Iran. As an elite institution, Imam Sadiq University is significantly more autonomous than other Iranian universities in inviting and employing lecturers, because it is a private organization.
Prominent reformist thinkers such as Abdolkarim Soroush, Hossein Bashiriyeh, Javad Tabatabaei have been given space to propound their own ideas in humanities.

The university offers BA, MA, and Ph.D. degrees in fields such as political science, economics, Islamic jurisprudence, law (private law, public law, criminal law, international law), management, and communications. It has eight colleges in operation.

Notable alumni
 Saeed Jalili, former Secretary of Supreme National Security Council and Iran's nuclear negotiator
 Ali Latifiyan, researcher, social-political theorist and Human rights activist
 Mohammad Sarafraz, head of IRIB
 Ali Bagheri, senior diplomat and Deputy Secretary of Iran's Supreme National Security Council
 Mohammad Hosseini, Minister of Culture and Islamic Guidance
 Mohsen Esmaeili, jurist and member of the Guardian Council
 Kazim Jalali, MP, former diplomat
 Ruhollah Ahmadzadeh, former vice president and head of Cultural Heritage and Tourism Organization, the youngest provincial governor in Iran 
 Abdollah Ramezanzadeh, politician
 Mostafa Kavakebian, politician
 Mohammad Ali Hosseini, deputy minister of Foreign Affairs and Ambassador to Italy
 Kamaladin Pirmoazzen, MP
 Kazem Gharib Abadi, ambassador in the Netherlands and to the OPCW ,Deputy Secretary General of the High Council for Human Rights on International Affairs 
 Reza Najafi, Ambassador to the International Atomic Energy Agency
 Mohammad Reza Majidi, Iran's Permanent Ambassador to the UNESCO
 Mostafa Dolatyar, Legal Advisor and Senior Diplomat in UN, Former Head of the Institute for Political and International Studies (IPIS), and nuclear negotiator
 Hossein Ghazavi, president of ECO Trade and Development Bank, former deputy of Minister of Economic Affairs and Finance
 Abbas Moghtadaei, MP
 Seyed Ali Mohammad Mousavi, senior diplomat, Secretary General of D-8 Organization for Economic Cooperation
  Hesamodin Ashna, cultural and press advisor to President Hassan Rouhani
 Ghazanfar Roknabadi, ambassador to Lebanon
Ali Elahi, Reference in Finance
 Peyman Jebelli, ambassador to Tunisia
 Alireza Enayati, ambassador to Kuwait
 Ali Akbar Rezaei, ambassador to Cyprus
 Samad ali Lakizadeh, ambassador to Poland and Lithuania
 Mohammad Rahim Aghieepour , ambassador to Slovenia
Ali Salehabadi, former head of the Central Bank of Iran. He was also the first chairman of the Stock Exchange and Securities Organization, and after that, he was the CEO of Iran Export Development Bank for a while.

Islamic Knowledge and Management Faculty
 
The Islamic Knowledge and Management(IKM) is the fifth Faculty of Imam Sadiq University which was established in 1989 with the aim of leading Islamic studies in the field of management and educating executive directors in the administration of Islamic countries. The faculty consists of four departments with activities in the fields of public administration and policymaking, business administration, financial management, and industrial management.

Over the years, the faculty has sought to create suitable ground for the growth of interdisciplinary studies in Islamic management through the gathering of specialist professors in Islamic knowledge and management from across the country. The students simultaneously study the fields of Islamic knowledge and management. By integrating these two fields innovatively, the background for exploiting religious principles in management is provided. Consequently, several groups of students who have graduated from this college are now active in theorizing on Islamic management, and in providing training in and implementing Islamic management patterns. So far, 700 students have graduated from this department and are providing services in important executive and academic jobs. The Faculty of Islamic Knowledge and Management of Imam Sadiq University is a suitable center for the development of Islamic management studies. Imam Sadiq University hopes to create an effective network of Islamic management scholars by building relations with other scholars in this field around the world, so that opportunities are provided for the development of integrated and interdisciplinary activities in this important field of science.

See also
 Higher education in Iran
 List of universities in Iran

References

External links

 

 
1982 establishments in Iran
Educational institutions established in 1982
Universities in Iran